Abadie is a French and English surname derived from the Occitan word abadia ("abbey"). Notable people with the surname include:

 Alberto Abadie (born 1968), Spanish economist
 Alejandro Abadie (born 1984), Argentine football player
 Alfred C. Abadie (1878–1950), American photographer and pioneer filmmaker
 Caroline Abadie (born 1976), French politician
 Claude Abadie (1920–2020), French jazz clarinettist and bandleader
 Elie Abadie (born 1960), Lebanese-American rabbi working in the United Arab Emirates
 François Abadie (1930–2001), French politician
 Henri Abadie (born 1963), French racing cyclist
 Henry Richard Abadie (1841–1915), British army officer
 Jean Marie Charles Abadie (1842–1932), French ophthalmologist
 Jean-Paul Abadie (born 1958), French chef
 Jeanette Abadie (born c. 1593), French alleged witch
 Jérémy Abadie (born 1988), French football player
 John Abadie (1854–1905), American baseball player
 Joseph Abadie (1873–1934), French neurologist
 Jules Abadie (1876–1953), French politician and surgeon
 Lisandro Abadie (born 1974), Argentine bass-baritone
 Paul Abadie (1812–1884), French architect and building restorer
 René Abadie (1935–1996), French cyclist
 Simon Abadie (born 1978), French race car driver
 William Abadie (born 1977) French actor

References

French-language surnames